Capeville is an unincorporated community in Northampton County, Virginia, United States.

The Arlington Archeological Site was listed on the National Register of Historic Places in 2008.

References

GNIS reference

Unincorporated communities in Virginia
Unincorporated communities in Northampton County, Virginia